Eastern red scorpionfish  may refer to:

 Scorpaena cardinalis, also called the grandfather hapuku, cardinal scorpionfish, Cook's scorpionfish, Cook's rockcod, Kermadec scorpionfish, Northern scorpionfish, red scorpion fish, red scorpion-cod or Sandy-bay cod, from northern New Zealand and the islands of the Tasman Sea.
 Scorpaena jacksoniensis, also called Billy Bougain, cardinal scorpionfish, coral cod, coral perch, Eastern red scorpioncod, fire cod, Northern scorpionfish, ocean perch, prickly heat, red rockcod or red scorpion-cod, endemic to southeastern Australia.